Old-Timers (Czech title Staříci) is a 2019 Czech thriller starring  Jiří Schmitzer and Ladislav Mrkvička. It was directed by Martin Dušek and Ondřej Provazník.

Plot
Vlastimil Reiner returns to the Czech Republic from Oregon. He meets with his old friend Antonín and together they plan to murder an elderly former Communist prosecutor who evaded punishment for his crimes under the Communist regime.

Cast
 Jiří Schmitzer as Vlastimil Reiner
 Ladislav Mrkvička as Antonín
 Dušan Kaprálik
 Michal Suchánek
 Přemysl Bureš
 Karel Jirák
 Marika Procházková
 Pavel Batěk

Reception
The film received generally positive reviews. It holds 68% on Kinobox as of March 2020.

Jiří Schmitzer and Ladislav Mrkvička have won the Main Trilobit Award for their performance in Old-Timers. Old-Timers was also nominated for 5 Czech Film Critics' Awards and 10 Czech Lion Awards.

References

External links
 

2019 films
Czech crime films
Czech drama films
2010s Czech-language films
Czech thriller films
Czech Lion Awards winners (films)